Iowa's 1st congressional district is a congressional district in the U.S. state of Iowa that covers its southeastern part, bordering the states of Illinois and  Missouri, and the Mississippi River. The district includes the cities of Davenport, Iowa City, Burlington, and Indianola. Republican Mariannette Miller-Meeks is the current U.S. representative.

Redistricting

On November 4, 2021, new congressional and state legislative maps were signed into law after the state's Legislative Services Agency had proposed them on October 21, 2021.

Cities in the district

Bellevue
Bettendorf
Burlington
Camanche
Clinton
Davenport
De Witt
Fairfield
Fort Madison
Indianola
Iowa City
Kalona
Keokuk
Keosauqua
Maquoketa
Marengo
Mount Pleasant
Muscatine
Newton
Oskaloosa
Pella
Sigourney
Solon
Wapello
Washington
Williamsburg
Wilton

Statewide races since 2000
Election results from statewide races:

List of members representing the district

Recent election results

2002

2004

2006

Note: James Hill ran on the Pirate Party platform on the ballot.

2008

2010

2012

2014

2016

2018

2020

Historical district boundaries

See also

Iowa's congressional districts
List of United States congressional districts

References

 Congressional Biographical Directory of the United States 1774–present

01